Eileen Richetelli is an American diver. She won a gold medal in platform diving at the 1991 Pan American Games.

She received a gold medal at the 1995 Summer Universiade in Fukuoka.

References

Year of birth missing (living people)
Living people
American female divers
Stanford Cardinal women's divers
Pan American Games gold medalists for the United States
Pan American Games medalists in diving
Universiade medalists in diving
Divers at the 1991 Pan American Games
Universiade gold medalists for the United States
Medalists at the 1995 Summer Universiade
Medalists at the 1991 Pan American Games